The lawn bowls competition at the 1974 British Commonwealth Games took place in Christchurch, New Zealand from 24 January until 2 February 1974. David Bryant won his third successive Commonwealth Games singles gold medal, with a medals cache of four golds although not competing in 1966. Host country New Zealand won the fours (their seventh gold medal since the start of the games in 1930).

Medal table

Medallists

Results

Men's singles – round robin

Men's pairs – round robin

Men's fours – round robin

References

See also
List of Commonwealth Games medallists in lawn bowls
Lawn bowls at the Commonwealth Games

Lawn bowls at the Commonwealth Games
1974 British Commonwealth Games events
Brit